Amrish Ranjan Pandey is a youth leader and is currently officiating as the National Secretary of the Indian Youth Congress. He was appointed the National Secretary of IYC in March 2020 and is currently the IYC In-charge for the State of West Bengal and was given the charge in July 2020, as West Bengal Assembly polls are also approaching. He is a practising lawyer in the Delhi-NCR region.

He started his political career with Congress Party's student Wing NSUI.  He has been very active in both student and youth politics at IYC and NSUI.

Early life
Amrish was born in Bihar on 25 October 1988, as son of Smt. Rajkumari Pandey and Shri Arun kumar Pandey. He traces his lineage to Shri Damodar Pande, who was the Mulkaji of Nepal from 1803 to 1804 and is also popularly known as the first Prime Minister of Nepal. Another significant face from Amrish's family is Rana Jang Pande, who was the third Mukhtiyar or Prime Minister of Nepal. After a political conspiracy, Amrish's forefathers shifted to Madhubani, Bihar and the family has been settled there since. Having completed his primary and secondary education from Watson High School, Madhubani, Amrish has strong ties with Madhubani.

Education and leadership training 
In year 2008, Amrish completed his Bachelor's degree in Philosophy from Zakir Hussain College, University of Delhi and thereafter completed his master's degree from University of Delhi. Amrish had his first rendezvous with politics, when he joined National Students Union of India in 2005, while studying at the Zakir Hussain College and since then he has never looked back. He is Bachelor of Law from Campus Law Center Delhi University.

Amrish is a political leader, not just by passion but also by formal training. He has been an active participant at various Konrad Adenauer School for Young Politicians Programme (KASYP) established by Konrad Adenauer Foundation. He was first granted a fellowship by the foundation in 2013. Since then Amrish has attended several KASYP workshops. He was also called on to attend the Legislative Fellow Program by U.S. Department of State in 2016, wherein, Amrish worked with the office of the Speaker, Columbus, Ohio. Thereafter, he also attended the Professional Fellows Congress (Office of Citizen Exchanges), Washington D.C. As an alumnus of Konrad Adenauer Foundation, Amrish has represented India in various programs. A detailed list of the same is as follows:

 Workshop on Political Parties Functions and Organisation in Democratic Societies in Yongon, Myanmar in Jan/Feb 2013.
 International Workshop on Youth and Politics in May 2013 held in Singapore.
 Workshop on Local Governance and Development in August 2013 in Singapore.
 Workshop on Leadership Training in Campaigning and Advertising organised in the month of March 2014 in Kuala Lumpur.
Workshop on Political Party Organization and local politics in September 2014 in Berlin and Erfurt, Germany.
Workshop on Political Party Organization and local politics in November 2015 in Davao.
KAS Young Political Leaders Caucus Meeting, 2017 for Sustainable Development Goals in SiemReap, Cambodia in February 2017.
KAS Young Political Leaders Caucus Meeting, 2018 for Sustainable Development Goals in Bangkok in December 2018.
KASYP grand Alumni meeting in the year 2019 held at Penang, Malaysia.

Administrative roles 
 Founder and Director – The Democratic Mirror – A Unique talk show on Media and Politics.
President – Center For Public Initiatives (NGO)
Former Secretary – Gandhi Study Circle at Zakir hussain College
Associate Volunteer – Gandhi Smriti and Darsan Samiti New Delhi.
Amrish is also the host and Director for a weekly talk show titled "Unveiling Political Truths", where he hosts renowned political personalities, journalists, educationists, and academicians etc. The show has hosted several personalities so far including Punya Prasun Bajpai, Sandeep Dikshit, Vivek Tankha, Rajiv Tyagi and Jaiveer Shergill etc.
Amrish and his media team also launched a nationwide oratory competition named Young India Ke Bol.

Social contribution
Major Programmes Organized

Acted as a volunteer of an International Seminar on Cultural Diversity in South Asia organized by Zakir Husain College in collaboration with Asia Project, India International Cente

Political career
Amrish first joined NSUI in 2005 while studying at Zakir Hussain College. He was made the National Media Coordinator of NSUI in 2011. Thereafter, he became the National Spokesperson of NSUI in 2013.

Looking at his impeccable credentials, Amrish was called on to become the National Media Coordinator of IYC in the year 2015 and holds the post since then. While being at the aforementioned position, Amrish has managed to bring talent from across the nation to his media team and is known as a great mentor amongst the team members. He was Appointed the National Spokesperson of IYC in 2016.

Amrish was made the National Secretary of IYC in March 2020.

Amrish has also been a member of the All India Congress Committee Vichar Vibhag since 2011 and has fulfilled various responsibilities during the assembly elections in UP, Uttarakhand, Punjab, Goa and Manipur.

References

Indian National Congress politicians
Living people
Year of birth missing (living people)
 Indian National Congress politicians from Bihar
 Indian Youth Congress